Major Frederick Harold Tubb, VC (28 November 1881 – 20 September 1917) was an Australian recipient of the Victoria Cross, the highest award for gallantry in the face of the enemy that can be awarded to British and Commonwealth forces.

Life and military
Tubb was born on 28 November 1881 to Harry and Emma E. Tubb, of St. Helena, Longwood East, Victoria, Australia.

He was 33 years old, and a lieutenant in the 7th Battalion, Australian Imperial Force, during the First World War when he was awarded the VC for his actions on 9 August 1915 at Lone Pine, Gallipoli. Lieutenant Tubb held a newly captured trench which was being counter-attacked by the enemy, who blew in a sand-bag barricade, leaving only a foot of it standing. Tubb led his men back, repulsed the enemy and rebuilt the barricade. Twice more the enemy blew in the barricade, but on each occasion this officer, although wounded in the head and arm, held his ground and assisted by corporals Alexander Burton and William Dunstan, rebuilt it, and maintained the position under heavy bombardment.

Citation

The March 27, 1916, Honolulu Star-Bulletin published a story that Tubb was one of four Australians who survived from a Regiment of 1128 men wiped out on the “bloody slopes of Anzac Cove in the Dardanelles campaign." He later achieved the rank of major and died of wounds suffered in battle at Polygon Wood, in the Third Battle of Ypres, on 20 September 1917. In this action Major Tubb was serving with 7th Battalion, 2nd Brigade, 1st Australian Division when he was shot by a German sniper during the Battle of the Menin Road Ridge. While being carried to the rear he was struck by British artillery shells. He died at the dressing station at Lijssenthoek and was buried at Lijssenthoek Military Cemetery, Belgium.

Medals
His Victoria Cross is displayed at the Australian War Memorial in Canberra, along with the eight other Australian Gallipoli VCs.

Tubb was awarded:
Victoria Cross
1914-15 Star
British War Medal
Victory Medal

References

External links
H. Murray Hamilton, 'Tubb, Frederick Harold (1881–1917)', Australian Dictionary of Biography, Volume 12, Melbourne University Press, 1990, pp 273–274.
Lieutenant Frederick Tubb VC, People profiles, Australian War Memorial
timeline; Cigarette card; Photographs: P02939.004; A02633; A02287; C02014

1881 births
1917 deaths
Australian Gallipoli campaign recipients of the Victoria Cross
Australian Army officers
Australian military personnel killed in World War I
People from Longwood, Victoria
Military personnel from Victoria (Australia)
Burials at Lijssenthoek Military Cemetery